Parliamentary elections were held in Norway in 1859. As political parties were not officially established until 1884, all those elected were independents. The number of seats in the Storting (Norwegian Parliament) was increased from 111 to 117. Voter turnout was 47.7%, although only 4.9% of the country's population was eligible to vote.

Results

References

General elections in Norway
19th-century elections in Norway
Norway
Parliamentary